The 113th Regiment Illinois Volunteer Infantry was an infantry regiment in the Union Army during the American Civil War.

Service
The 113th Illinois Volunteer Infantry Regiment, also known as the Third Chicago Board of Trade regiment, was organized at Camp Hancock near Chicago, Illinois, and mustered in for three years service on 1 October 1862, under the command of Colonel George Blaikie Hoge.

The regiment was attached to 1st Brigade, District of Memphis, Tennessee, Right Wing, XIII Corps, Department of the Tennessee, November 1862. 1st Brigade, 2nd Division, District of Memphis, XIII Corps, to December 1862. 1st Brigade, 2nd Division, Sherman's Yazoo Expedition to January 1863. 1st Brigade, 2nd Division, XV Corps, Army of the Tennessee, to August 1863. 3rd Brigade, 2nd Division, XVI Corps, to November 1863. Post of Corinth, Mississippi, 2nd Division, XVI Corps, to January 1864. 2nd Brigade, District of Memphis, Tennessee, XVI Corps, to June 1864. 2nd Brigade, Sturgis' Expedition, June 1864. 1st Brigade, Post of Memphis, District of West Tennessee, to February 1865. Unattached, Post of Memphis, District of West Tennessee, to June 1865.

Of note, Companies C, D, F, I, and K were sent north to Chicago with prisoners of war after the capture of Arkansas Post on 11 January 1863. The remaining five stayed to participate in the siege and capture of Vicksburg. C, D, F, I, and K rejoined the regiment in December 1864.

During the solicitation for volunteers for the 2nd Division of XV Corps (Union Army)' diversionary storming party, or "forlorn hope," that produced many Medals of Honor on 22 May 1863, the 113th's five companies were assigned a quota of three, unmarried men (the quota for the division was two officers and fifty men from each of the three brigades). The remainder of the regiment took part in the failed assault on 22 May. Even though the assault failed to breach the defenses, the regiment was kept forward and deployed as skirmishers to constantly snipe at the defenders for the next two days, a role it would continue until the capitulation on 4 July 1863.

The 113th Illinois Infantry mustered out of service on 20 June 1865.

Casualties
The regiment lost a total of 303 men during service; 1 officer and 25 enlisted men killed or mortally wounded, 4 officers and 273 enlisted men died of disease.

Detailed service

Notable members
 Burritt, William W., Private, Company G - Medal of Honor recipient for action at Vicksburg, 27 April 1863
 Darrough, John S., Sergeant, Company F - Medal of Honor recipient for action at Eastport, Mississippi, 10 October 1864
 Gould, Newton T., Private, Company G - Medal of Honor recipient for action at Vicksburg, 22 May 1863
 Henry, James, Sergeant, Company B - Medal of Honor recipient for action at Vicksburg, 22 May 1863
 Johns, Elisha, Corporal, Company B - Medal of Honor recipient for action at Vicksburg, 22 May 1863
 Miller, Jacob C., Private, Company G - Medal of Honor recipient for action at Vicksburg, 22 May 1863
 Rankin, Adam Lowry, Chaplain - abolitionist and son of noted abolitionist John Rankin

See also
 List of Illinois Civil War units
 Illinois in the American Civil War
 Battle of Chickasaw Bayou
 Battle of Arkansas Post (1863)
 Yazoo Pass expedition
 Battle of Port Gibson
 Battle of Champion Hill
 Siege of Vicksburg (19 May & 22 May assaults)
 Battle of Brices Cross Roads

Notes

References

External links
History and rosters of the 113th Illinois Infantry from the Illinois Adjutant General's Report
 Palantine HIstorical Society's Civil War page
A Forlorn Hope
Vicksburg Medal of Honor Recipients

Military units and formations established in 1862
Military units and formations disestablished in 1865
Units and formations of the Union Army from Illinois
1862 establishments in Illinois